Eli Raphael Marozzi (1913–1999) was a sculptor, ceramist, teacher, and illustrator.

He was born in Motegallo, Italy, but came to the United States as a child and grew up in Pennsylvania. He served in the United States military from 1941 to 1943. Marozzi received a bachelor's degree from the University of Washington in 1949 and a master's degree from the University of Hawaii in 1952.  His public sculptures include:

 Nartanam, a cast white marble aggregate relief sculpture at the Tennent Art Foundation Gallery, Honolulu, Hawaii, 1958
 The Cat, a concrete sculpture at Leeward Community College, Honolulu, Hawaii, 1970
 As You Like It, terrazzo sculpture at Honolulu Stadium State Park, Honolulu, Hawaii, 1981
 E Pluribus Unum, a white Vermont marble sculpture at President Thomas Jefferson Elementary School, Honolulu, Hawaii, 1982
 Kuikahi, a terrazzo sculpture at Waianae High School, Honolulu, Hawaii, 1985

In addition to his art and teaching, Marozzi traveled extensively in India, heightening his interest in Indian art and philosophy.  His sculpture E Pluribus Unum, installed at Jefferson Elementary School in Honolulu, Hawaii, shows the Indian Hindu influence on the artist's style.  He founded the Vedanta Society of Hawaii, and served as president from its inception.  He illustrated the book, Buddhist Stories for Children by E. K. Shinkaku Hunt (published by Takiko Ichinose, 1959 ASIN: B0007HEFCU).  Marozzi died in a hospice on August 31, 1999 at age 86.

Printed works
 Hunt, E. K. Shinkaku & illustrated by Eli R. Marozzi, Buddhist Stories for Children,  Honolulu, Takiko Ichinose, 1959 ASIN: B0007HEFCU
  Master of Arts Thesis

Footnotes

References
 Falk, Peter Hastings, Who Was Who in American Art, Madison, CT, Sound View Press, 1999.
 Morse, Harold, Honolulu sculptor, artist Eli R. Marozzi dies at 86, Honolulu Star-Bulletin, September 8, 1999.
 Radford, Georgia and Warren Radford, Sculpture in the Sun, Hawaii's Art for Open Spaces, University of Hawaii Press, 1978, 35, 94.

External links
 Eli Marozzi in AskArt.com
 Eli Marozzi in the Art Inventories Catalog of the Smithsonian American Art Museum
 Hawaii State foundation on Culture and the Arts

American sculptors
Italian sculptors
Artists from Hawaii
Vedanta
Italian ceramists
1999 deaths
1913 births
20th-century ceramists
Italian emigrants to the United States
University of Hawaiʻi at Mānoa alumni
University of Washington alumni